Eoacmaea albonotata is a species of sea snail, a true limpet, a marine gastropod mollusk in the family Eoacmaeidae, one of the families of true limpets. The species is found off Natal, South Africa.

References

 Smith, E.A. (1901) On South African marine shells, with descriptions of new species. Journal of Conchology, 10, 104–116, 1 pl.
 Nakano T. & Ozawa T. (2007). Worldwide phylogeography of limpets of the order Patellogastropoda: molecular, morphological and paleontological evidence. Journal of Molluscan Studies 73(1): 79–99

Eoacmaeidae
Gastropods described in 1901